The Soul of the Children is a 1951  Argentine drama film directed and written by Carlos F. Borcosque. The film stars Julio Esbrez, Paolo Loew, Carlos Perelli and Maruja Roig.

Cast
 Julio Norberto Esbrez
 Carlos Perelli
 Maruja Roig
 Jorge Ragel
 Nora Gálvez
 Hugo Lanzillotta
 Paola Loew
 Julio J. Malaval
 Fausto Rodríguez
 Carlos Abel Caso
 Francisco Lodrago
 Vito Acquaviva
 Luis Bertolini
 Valo Caneva
 Yoli Vergani
 Mary Lewis
 Nery Smirna
 Antonio Baena
 Miguel Falsa
 Salomón Michitte
 Adolfo Verde
 Jorge Iris
 Juan C. Romero
 Ruben H. Cogni

References

External links

1951 films
1950s Spanish-language films
Argentine black-and-white films
Films directed by Carlos F. Borcosque
Argentine drama films
1951 drama films
1950s Argentine films